Alva Revista Fitch (September 10, 1907 – November 25, 1989) was a lieutenant general in the United States Army and was deputy director of Defense Intelligence Agency from 1964 to 1966. He commanded an artillery battalion during the Battle of Bataan and was a prisoner of war from 1942 to 1945. From October 16, 1961, to January 5, 1964, Fitch served as the assistant chief of staff for intelligence, Headquarters, Department of the Army.

Early life  
Born in Amherst, Nebraska, on September 10, 1907, son of Gertrude De La Barre and John Albert Fitch. Fitch was the first Eagle Scout in Nebraska, and one of the very earliest west of the Mississippi River. He graduated from Kearney High School and received an appointment to West Point, having been nominated by Nebraska senator  Robert B. Howell.

Junior officer
Fitch graduated from the United States Military Academy at West Point in June 1930 and became a second lieutenant in the Field Artillery. He was promoted to first lieutenant in September 1935 and served as aide-de-camp to Gen. Lesley J. McNair from 1937 to 1939.

World War II 
 
Fitch was sent to Fort Stotsenburg  in the Philippines in February 1940 and He commanded Battery A of the  23rd Field Artillery Regiment, which was armed with horse and mule drawn QF 2.95-inch Mountain Guns. He was promoted to captain in June 1940.

After the  invasion of the Philippines began on 8 December 1941,  the 23rd Field Artillery was attached to the 26th Cavalry Regiment on December 13 and retreated with other units of I Corps to Bataan. Fitch was promoted to major in January 1942 and was put in command of the 71st Field Artillery when Colonel Halstead C. Fowler was wounded. Fitch received the Distinguished Service Cross for leading a battalion of artillery cut off by Japanese encirclement to remaining I Corp units south of Mauban. He was captured in May 1942 a few days after surrender and taken prisoner.

A survivor of the Bataan Death March, he was held at Luzon at Camp O'Donnell In December 1944 he was transferred with other Bataan survivors aboard the Ōryoku Maru to the Fukuoka prison camps. He was released in September 1945. He was awarded the Distinguished Service Cross and the Silver Star for heroism and courage in combat and while a captive of the Japanese.

Post-war
From February to July 1946, he attended the Command and General Staff College at Fort Leavenworth, Kansas, and remained as an instructor until August 1947.

In the Korean War, Fitch was an artillery commander and then commanded the 3rd Armored Division. He later served as Chief of Staff of Army Intelligence before being named to the Defense Intelligence Agency post in 1964.

Military intelligence
He served on the Army Aircraft Requirements Review Board, also known as the Rogers Board, which was established on January 15, 1960, by the Army Chief of Staff to review the Army Aircraft Development Plan and the related industry proposals. The Rogers Board's members included Major Generals Hamilton H. Howze, Thomas F. Van Natta, Robert J. Wood, Richard D. Meyer, Ernest F. Easterbrook, and chairman Lieutenant General Gordon B. Rogers; and its results prefigured the more influential Howze Board on airmobility.

Retirement and death
Fitch retired from active duty in 1966 and was military editor of the Kiplinger Newsletter from 1966 to 1975.

He died at Walter Reed Army Medical Center, Washington, D.C., on November 25, 1989, and was buried in Section 30 of Arlington National Cemetery. General Fitch is a member of the Military Intelligence Hall of Fame.

Notable subordinates
General Fitch was Elvis Presley's commanding officer during the singer's stint in the army from 1958 to 1960.

Future U.S. Secretary of State Colin Powell was a lieutenant with the 3rd Armored Division under General Fitch.

Gallery

See also

26th Cavalry Regiment

References

Bibliography

External links

Fitch's headstone at Arlington National Cemetery

1907 births
1989 deaths
People from Buffalo County, Nebraska
Military personnel from Nebraska
United States Military Academy alumni
United States Army personnel of World War II
Bataan Death March prisoners
United States Army personnel of the Korean War
United States Army generals
Burials at Arlington National Cemetery
Recipients of the Distinguished Service Cross (United States)
Recipients of the Distinguished Service Medal (US Army)
Recipients of the Silver Star
Recipients of the Legion of Merit
American prisoners of war in World War II
World War II prisoners of war held by Japan
People of the Defense Intelligence Agency
American torture victims